The 2nd Conference of the 7th Season of the Shakey's V-League in volleyball will be held from July 11, 2010 to late September at the Filoil Flying V Arena. Second Conference shall be governed by the FIVB Official Volleyball Rules. 3-time champions University of Santo Tomas Tigresses refused to defend their crown and it paved the way for the entry of two new schools, National University and University of Perpetual Help System Dalta. San Sebastian College, Far Eastern University, and Lyceum of the Philippines University maintain their perfect league attendance. Other participating teams include UAAP powerhouses Ateneo de Manila University and Adamson University and NCAA Runner-up College of Saint Benilde.

Tournament format
Preliminaries
The eight participating teams will play one round. The six teams with the best win–loss records, after the round, will qualify into the quarter-finals.
In the event of a two-way tie for 6th place, the tie will be resolved by a play-off game.
If three or more teams are tied for 6th place, FIVB Rules shall apply to determine the best two which will play-off to resolve the tie.
Quarter-finals
The six qualified teams will play one round. With the win–loss records of the preliminaries carried over into the quarter-finals, the four teams with the best win–loss records, after the round, will qualify into the semi-finals.
In the event of a two-way tie for 4th place, the tie will be resolved by a play-off game.
If three or more teams are tied for 4th place, FIVB Rules shall apply to determine the best two which will play-off to resolve the tie.
Semi-finals
A best-of-three series will be played between the 1st and 4th placed teams of the quarters.
A best-of-three series will be played between the 2nd and 3rd placed teams of the quarters.
Finals
A best-of-three series will be played between the 2 winners of the semis for the gold.
A best-of-three series will be played between the 2 losers of the semis for the bronze.
If the gold medalist is determined in two games, the series for the bronze medal will also end in two games. If the contenders for the bronze are tied after two games, then FIVB Rules will determine the winner.

Preliminaries

Team standings

SW = sets won; SL = sets lost

Results

Sixth-seed playoff

|}

Quarterfinals
Quarterfinal Standings

Team Standings

SW = sets won; SL = sets lost

Results

Fourth-seed playoff
|}

Bracket

Semifinals

SSC-R vs. FEU

SSC-R leads series, 1-0

SSC-R wins series, 2-0

Adamson vs. Lyceum

Adamson leads series, 1-0

Adamson wins series, 2-0

Finals

Bronze series

Lyceum leads series, 1-0

Lyceum wins series, 2-0

Championship series

Adamson leads series, 1-0

Series Tied, 1-1

Adamson wins series, 2-1

Final ranking
Champion - 
1st runner-up - 
2nd runner-up -
3rd runner-up -

Shakey's V-League conferences
2010 in Philippine sport